Florid is an unincorporated community in Putnam County, Illinois, United States, located about  southeast of Hennepin.

References

Unincorporated communities in Putnam County, Illinois
Unincorporated communities in Illinois